Tetsu was a modern Japanese restaurant conceived by Michelin-starred chef Masa Takayama, Tetsu served a Robatayaki-based menu with an emphasis upon grilled fare. The first location opened in the Aria Resort & Casino on the Las Vegas Strip in 2012, replacing Chef Takayama's Shaboo, which had occupied the space since 2009.  In November 2017 a second branch opened in the Tribeca neighborhood of New York City. The New York location featured a casual ground-floor space for a la carte dining, and a separate cellar space named Basement which served fixed-price omakase meals.

In February 2018, it was announced that original Las Vegas location of Tetsu would be closing on April 2 of that year.   The NY location closed in Feb 2020.

References

External links 
 Tetsu Las Vegas
 Tetsu New York

Restaurants in Manhattan
Restaurants established in 2012
Restaurants disestablished in 2020
Defunct restaurants in New York City